Blitzkid is an American horror punk band from Bluefield, West Virginia. One of the leading exponents of the horror punk scene, the band is led by singer/guitarist TB Monstrosity and singer/bassist Argyle Goolsby. Active from 1997 until 2012 and reforming in 2020, Blitzkid released five studio albums, appeared on numerous compilations, and toured both nationally and internationally.

History
Goolsby, who credits his late mother for giving him the "dedication" to be successful in music, and Monstrosity, who admits to having had the ambition to make Blitzkid a "huge" band, began playing as Blitzkid in early 1997. Initially the duo were motivated by escaping boredom and creating a soundtrack for skating, but over time developed an interest in expressing thoughts about "universal understanding of the world and yourself and your place in it" by embedding metaphors within the dark imagery of their lyrics.

Artist, children's author, and film maker Gris Grimly approached Blitzkid to compose the title track to his 2006 film Cannibal Flesh Riot. The band did this, and also received Grimly artwork to use for a Blitzkid T-shirt design.

Blitzkid played 260 live dates in 2006. In August 2007, the band played the heavy metal-oriented Summer Breeze Open Air festival in Germany in front of 40,000 concert goers. Another notable live gig the band played that summer was supporting The Damned in Prague. The Damned are an important influence to the band and to horror punk generally, and are one of the original UK punk bands.

Blitzkid were back in Germany one year later, this time taking the main stage at the gothic rock themed M'era Luna Festival, playing before an audience of between 20,000 and 25,000.

In July 2010, during their tenth tour of Europe, Blitzkid were one of 34 bands to play the alternative rock Amphi Festival in Cologne, for as many as 50,000 attendees.

In 2011, Blitzkid were third on the bill of a North American tour with Face to Face, Strung Out, and the Darlings. This tour helped raise the band's profile in the wider punk community. A reviewer for the Dallas Observer found the band's "speedy pop-punk with a tinge of metal and classic Misfits" to be "worthy" and "polished", while a reviewer of the Houston show opined that Blitzkid's fusion of "horror punk, '50s rock, and hardcore elements... kicked quite a bit of ass". On the other hand, the advance coverage of the event in Nashville Scene, while praising the two headliners, dismissed Blitzkid as "gothy-looking mall rockers". Following this tour Blitzkid again played Germany's Summer Breeze Open Air festival in August 2011.

During Blitzkid's final European tour in 2012, which also included 14 dates in Germany, seven in the UK, three in the Czech Republic, and two in Slovakia, the band played in Russia for the first time, headlining a one-hour 45 minute show at Moscow's Relax Club. The UK dates included second billing (out of five bands) to Alien Sex Fiend at the November 3 lineup of the Whitby Goth Weekend.

Citing changing family commitments, Monstrosity announced his intention to leave Blitzkid in 2011, but remain in his side-band, Vagora, which had a less demanding tour schedule. Blitzkid officially broke up by the end of 2012, with Argyle Goolsby embarking on a solo career. As of July 2014, Goolsby and Monstrosity's current musical projects are the bands Argyle Goolsby and the Roving Midnight and A Gathering of None respectively.

A documentary of Blitzkid's history titled Blitzkid: Return to the Living, directed by Jeff Frumess of Video Business Media, is currently in post production.

After having reunited for two nights to appear at the Jason Trioxin tribute shows in Teaneck NJ in June 2019, the band has announced a reunion tour in spring 2020 called the Escape the Grave tour.

Notable collaborations
Blitzkid has a connection with the original and, by many accounts, leading horror punk progenitors, the Misfits. In 2007, Goolsby played bass and performed vocal duties for Gorgeous Frankenstein, a project headed by ex-Misfits guitarist Doyle Wolfgang von Frankenstein. He played with Doyle's band while remaining in Blitzkid, making him one of horror punk's more visible figures. Doyle returned the favor by guesting on "Mr. Sardonicus" on Blitzkid's Apparitional album. Doyle is one of two ex-Misfits to have collaborated with Blitzkid; Dr. Chud has played drums for Blitzkid at several gigs including the M'era Luna Festival. Chud's playing with Blitzkid can be heard on both the rare Hell Nights Tour 7″ picture disk and on the Anatomy of Reanimation LP. In 2002, Goolsby also played bass for The Undead, the notable horror punk band featuring ex-Misfit Bobby Steele.

Musical style
Blitzkid's melodic approach to the horror punk genre was noted for its strong vocals; Allmusic has described Monstrosity and Goolsby's singing as "immediately appealing". Not all critics were enamored with their music however; the reviewer for Apoch's Metal Review expressed an unfavorable view of some of the band's non-vocal instrumentation. A third reviewer, in a favorable appraisal, expressed the opinion that lyrical concerns aside, Apparitional-era Blitzkid was not sonically dissimilar to such notable punk rock peers as Bouncing Souls, NOFX, and AFI.

Impact

Writing about the band's then-forthcoming retirement, Zachary Ehren of the Huffington Post remarked that "the legend of their music will continue to live on through their dedicated fanbase and the continuous terror they bring to mothers as their children listen to them across the globe." Another reviewer had a more modest assessment of the band's impact; while conceding Blitzkid had been "in the Horror Punk spotlight ... for quite some time", it was suggested that that particular spotlight does not shine particularly brightly due to the band's "underground tactics".

Matt Pathetic, organizer of an annual horror punk festival in New Jersey, reflecting on his perspective of having had the band pester him to be included in 2001, only to become a perennial headliner until their retirement: "Ten years ago a lot of people used to say Blitzkid sounds like the new Misfits. Well, being involved in this scene for a decade, I can say nowadays there's a lot of bands that sound like Blitzkid." But if others see Blitzkid as having left a significant mark, Argyle Goolsby, speaking after the band's last UK gig, is more humble: "I don't have these unreal expectations that we have to have been this ground-breaking blueprint band, I'm not looking for that. I'm just looking for someone to play our CD like ten years from now. When they have a good day. Or a bad day."

Band members
Timeline

Discography

Albums

Demos
1997: Songs for the Aesthetically Challenged (re-release in 2010, only downloadable)

EPs
1999: Terrifying Tales (re-released in 2012 on EMI Germany)
1999: Revisited
2003: Exhuming Graves and Making Dates (split 10-inch LP with Mister Monster)
2006: Everyday Is Halloween (split 7-inch LP with The Spook)
2007: Split Personalities (split 7-inch LP with The Cryptkeeper Five)
2008: Hell Night's Tour 7-inch picture disc (only 66 copies pressed; features Dr. Chud on drums)
2010: Fistfull of Balls Volume 1 (split with Nim Vind)
2011: Head over Hills (7-inch LP)

Misc. releases
2004: Hollow Bodies (acoustic live album)
2009: Studio Dead (live album, only downloadable)
2009: Revisited (new edition, only downloadable)
2009: Rarities (rarities album, only downloadable)

Compilations
2003: This Is Horror Punk (song: "Lupen Tooth")
2006: Horror High presents: Prom Queen Massacre (song: "Pretty in a Casket")
2006: Fiendforce Cuts Vol 1 (song: "Terror (in the haunted house)" and "Dementia")
2006: Ox-Compilation # 67 (song: "Terror (in the haunted house)")
2006: Sonic Seducer – Cold Hands Seduction Vol 62 (song: "Mary and the Storm")
2006: Zillo Scope Signs & Sounds New 2006/09 (song: "Carve out a Heart")
2006: Cannibal Flesh Riot (song: "Cannibal Flesh Riot")
2007: It Came from Trafalgar Soundtrack Volume # 1 (song: "Demon Machine")
2007: Paid in Black: A Tribute to Johnny Cash (song: "I Walk the Line")
2008: Get acquainted Vol 1 (song: "I'm a Zombie," "Hate you better" and "Ad Nauseum Memorie (live)")
2010: The Sound of Horror – Volume 1 (song: "Love Like Blood")
2011: Ox-Compilation # 95 (song: "She won't stop bleeding")
2011: XtraX Clubtrax Vol 3 (song: "Jane Doe # 9")

References

External links

 
 

American punk rock groups
Century Media Records artists
EMI Records artists
Horror punk groups
Musical groups from West Virginia
Musical groups established in 1997
Musical groups disestablished in 2012